Flindersia brassii, commonly known as hard scented maple or Claudie River scented maple, is a species of tree that is endemic to Queensland. It has pinnate leaves with between four and nine narrow elliptical leaflets, white or cream-coloured flowers arranged in panicles, and fruit studded with rough points.

Description

Taxonomy
Flindersia brassii was first formally described in 1975 by Thomas Gordon Hartley and Bernard Hyland in the Journal of the Arnold Arboretum, from specimens Hyland collected near the Upper Claudie River in the Iron Range. The specific epithet (brassii) honours Leonard John Brass.

Distribution and habitat

Conservation status
Flindersia brassii is classified as of "least concern" under the Queensland Government Nature Conservation Act 1992.

References

brassii
Flora of Queensland
Sapindales of Australia
Trees of Australia
Plants described in 1975
Taxa named by Thomas Gordon Hartley
Taxa named by Bernard Hyland